The 2015–16 Euro Hockey Tour is the 20th season of Euro Hockey Tour. It started on 5 November 2015 and lasted until 30 April 2016. It consisted of Karjala Cup, Channel One Cup and Euro Hockey Tour Games. Sweden won the tournament.

Total standings

Karjala Cup

The Karjala Cup was played between 5–8 November 2015. Five of the matches were played in Helsinki, Finland, and one match in Örnsköldsvik, Sweden. Tournament was won by Sweden.

Channel One Cup

The Channel One Cup was played between 17–20 December 2015. Five of the matches were played in Russia, and one match in Czech Republic. Tournament was won by Czech Republic.

Euro Hockey Tour Games
All times are local.

External links
 Official Site of European Hockey Tour 

 
Euro Hockey Tour
2015–16 in European ice hockey